Cheirolaena is a genus of flowering plants belonging to the family Malvaceae.

Its native range is Madagascar.

Species:
 Cheirolaena linearis Benth. & Hook.f.

References

Malvaceae
Malvaceae genera
Endemic flora of Madagascar